The Frog Rapids are located at Frog Rapids Narrows on the English River near Sioux Lookout in the Kenora District of Northwestern Ontario, Canada. They connect Abram Lake to Pelican Lake.

References
Atlas of Canada topographic map sheet 52J4 accessed 2007-11-10
The Official Road Map of Ontario on-line section 13 accessed 2007-11-10

Landforms of Kenora District
Rapids of Canada